The Benton Community School Corporation administers the one high school/middle school and two elementary schools in Benton County, Indiana.  Its offices are located in the county seat of Fowler, Indiana. The superintendent is Scott Van der aa. The corporation covers more land area (447 sq. miles) than any other single school corporation in the state.

History
In the fall of 2006, the students of Fowler Elementary School and Oxford Elementary School began attending a new consolidated school named Prairie Crossing located in Oxford. In the fall of 2021 students from the former Boswell Elementary began attending Prairie Crossing as well.

Schools
Benton Central Junior-Senior High School

Otterbein Elementary
Prairie Crossing Elementary School

References

External links
 Benton Community School Corporation

School districts in Indiana
Education in Benton County, Indiana